The Nubia was a cargo ship built in 1882 by D. & W. Henderson & Co. Ltd. of Meadowside, Clydeside, Glasgow and operated by Anchor Line Ltd of Glasgow. In 1906 it was sold to Cia de Comercio e Navegacao of Rio de Janeiro and renamed SS São Luiz. The ship ran aground on 10 January 1911 off the coast of  Rio Grande do Norte in Brazil.

References

1882 ships
Steamships of the United Kingdom
Maritime incidents in 1911